Green Island is a small island lying off the eastern coast of Antigua. It is a private island that has been owned by the Mill Reef Club since 1947. It lies close to the mouth of Nonsuch Bay.

Colonel Richard Ayres was granted the lease of Green Island in 1673. By 1731 it was owned by Stephen Blizard, and was still owned by Blizard's heirs in 1790. The heirs of Robert Maginley owned the island in 1921. Maginley and his three brothers were immigrants to Antigua from Ireland and eventually owned 4,500 acres making them the largest landholders on Antigua. A plantation was established on Green Island, very little evidence remains of the sugar mill on Green Island.

Geography 
Green Island is located off the southeastern peninsula of Antigua, at the southern entrance to Nonsuch Bay. Towards the mainland, the  Green Bay, a bay-like strait south of the island, in front of Cape Cork Point, Green Island is only about 350 meters away from Antigua island.
Administratively, it belongs to the Saint Phillip Parish.

The island itself measures about two kilometers from west to east; its width varies by two south-facing peninsulas in the range of a few hundred meters (maximum 650 m), forming several sheltered bays. Altogether, the island has an area of about 40ha.
A sea-side peninsula ends in the Man of War Point, as the eastern tip of Antigua (as a region, east point of the main island the Neck of Land), from which the Atlantic Ocean extends over nearly 4,000 kilometers to the approximately latitude Cape Verde.
The island rises only a few meters above sea level, and is composed of tropical brushwood and partly lined by rock, partly by pure white beaches. On both sides are reefs and rocks in front, the northern reef blocks the entire Nonsuch Bay and extends to Long Bay.

References

Private islands of Antigua and Barbuda